Ghostly is the adjectival form of ghost.

 Ghostly (musician) (born 1997), English MC and producer
 Alice Ghostley (1923–2007), American actress
 Ghostly International, an American independent record label
 Ghostly, a 2015 anthology of ghost stories by Audrey Niffenegger

See also
 
 Ghost (disambiguation)
 Ghosty, an American indie rock band
 Ghosty (producer), a British record producer